Presidential elections were held in Ecuador in 1924. The result was a victory for Gonzalo Córdova, who received 93% of the vote.

Results

References

Presidential elections in Ecuador
Ecuador
1924 in Ecuador
Election and referendum articles with incomplete results